Chrysanthos Sisinis can refer to:

 Chrysanthos Sisinis (died 1845), Greek revolutionary fighter and politician
 Chrysanthos Sisinis (general), Greek general